Bahubuthayo (also spelled Bahu boothayo) is a 2002 Sinhala comedy mystery film written and directed by Udayakantha Warnasuriya, and co-produced by the director himself with Deepa Fernando for Fun Flower Films. The film features Paboda Sandeepani, Mahendra Perera and Rodney Warnakula in the leading roles while Vijaya Nandasiri, Richerd Manamudali, Srinath Maddumage, and Quintus Weerakoon in supporting roles. Music composed by Ananda Perera. The film is the prequel in 2015 Gindari film. Produced by EAP circuit cinemas, showed more than 50 theatres. It released on 8 August 2002 and was a commercial hit in Sri Lankan film history in that year, which induced the director to make its sequels. The film was shot at locations around Colombo. It is the 985th Sri Lankan film in the Sinhala cinema.

Plot
Lanti and Bunty are two young journalists, who go out on an assignment to the southerns village of Kirindiwela, where according to the legends, an abode of evil spirits in ancient times, to write a feature on devil dancing and exorcist rituals for a travel publication. When a possessed women in the village aroused and follows them fiercely, they managed to flee to the jungle. Its getting dark and they see a small house. While spending their first night in this jungle home of a village exorcist Elaris Appuhami, Bunty and Lanty were pleasantly surprised to encounter a pretty young girl named Tikiri, who Elaris told Lanti and Bunty was his domestic helper. Without the permission, Bunty took a photo of Tikiri as well.

At the dinner, when Bunty asked Tikiri to come with them, Tikiri agreed, but it was just a joke by Bunty. When Lanty and Bunty set out the next morning, they suddenly found that Tikiri following them. When all their efforts to send her back home failed, the desperate young men explain their plight to the Chief Priest of the village temple, who informed them that Tikiri was in fact an evil spirit which posed off as a human being. Elaris Appuhami charmed to live with her as his helper. The shocked journalists plead with the chief priest to save them from this evil woman. The chief priest tells them that he will finish this nuisance, but after before months, come back and help to build a temple bell pole. Lanti and Bunty accepted to this and priest remove Tikiri from their path.

Bunty and Lanti return to home believing that their traumatic experience has ended. Three months end and they forget to go back to village and build the bell. The bind released Tikiri back to their home and they take every possible way to banish her, but all fails. Their housemate, Chaminda, their office friends, and a local gang also captured by Tikiri's possessed and abilities. One day, they met a god, who take the human shape fall on to land. Lanti and Bunty explained their horror experience to god and plead to remove her from their home. God, who is an alcoholic, came to see the spirit. But, due to human being shape, god thinks she is just a normal pretty girl. But, after Lanti and Bunty confirms that, she is posed off to a human being, god take a magical spectacle and observe Tikiri with the spectacle. Truth reveals that she is a devil. Magical spectacle, which was given to Lanty and Bunty has the power to visualize actual appearance of devils, god and humans as it is.

God tries to remove her with god's power, but Tikiri thrashed him and god flees. After many incidents to remove her back, Lanty and Bunty took help from spectacle to see actual god and devils. Finally, all sorts of trouble, Lanty remembers about the village temple bell. Lanty and Bunty quickly went village and meets Chief Priest. Lanty and Bunty with the help of villagers started to build the temple bell tower. After finished the work, Priest provided a bowl of holy water (Pirith pan) of Lord Buddha and said this can remove her from the home.

They came back to home and see a dance party at their home. With the help of magical spectacle, they revealed that all at the party are devils. Holy water was mixed to water tank and they pumped all water towards them. Devils screamed and perished from the home. But, all water in the tank finished and still Tikiri was at the home. Bunty was however, able to take some water to his mouth and released them towards Tikiri. Tikiri screamed and she also perished, giving their home free from devils. However, there were few holy water collects at the bottle, which was used to perish devils wandered around the city. In the end credits, the caged bat showed.

Cast
 Paboda Sandeepani as Tikiri, the devil spirit
 Mahendra Perera as Lanti
 Rodney Warnakula as Bunty
 Richerd Manamudali as Chaminda
 Vijaya Nandasiri as Alcoholic god
 Srinath Maddumage as Sakkara Gune
 Quintus Weerakoon as Head monk
 Sarath Kulanga as one office friend
 Gamini Hettiarachchi as red shirt friend
 Anton Jude as Devil in the bus
 D.B. Gangodathenna as Interviewed villager
 Janesh Silva as Police constable
 Rajitha Hiran as Temple worker
 Senaka Perera as Elaris Gurunnanse
 Upali Keerthisena as Bar waiter
 Damitha Saluwadana as Dewala chanter
 Sarath Chandrasiri as Street devil

Release
Pre-production were completed in January 2002. The film was released on 2002 in more than 25 EAP circuit cinemas and ended the theatrical shows in November 2002. The film went on to become a huge commercial success. The film easily passed commercially successful 50 and 100 days as well.

Soundtrack

References

2001 films
2000s Sinhala-language films
Films set in Sri Lanka (1948–present)
Films directed by Udayakantha Warnasuriya